Romāns Miloslavskis (born 17 October 1983 in Liepāja, Latvia) is a swimmer and politician from Latvia. He has participated in 2004 Summer Olympics and 2008 Summer Olympics. Miloslavskis was 35th in 100 m freestyle at Athens Olympics and achieved 25th place in 200 m freestyle at Beijing Olympics. He holds several Latvian records in swimming. He is a member of the Liepāja City Council for the Harmony Party.

References

External links

1983 births
Living people
Sportspeople from Liepāja
Latvian people of Russian descent
Social Democratic Party "Harmony" politicians
Deputies of the 12th Saeima
Latvian male freestyle swimmers
Olympic swimmers of Latvia
Swimmers at the 2004 Summer Olympics
Swimmers at the 2008 Summer Olympics